Ahmed Younis (born February 10, 1991) is an Egyptian former professional footballer who played as a center-back for the Egyptian club Enppi. He was on the official squads for the FIFA U-20 World Cup 2011 and Africa U-23 Cup of Nations in 2011 in South Africa.

References

External links
 
 

1991 births
Living people
ENPPI SC players
Egyptian footballers
Association football defenders
Place of birth missing (living people)
Egyptian Premier League players